Robert Michael Myers (born March 31, 1975) is a basketball executive who is the president of basketball operations and general manager for the Golden State Warriors of the National Basketball Association (NBA). He is a former sports agent with Wasserman Media Group after interning with agent Arn Tellem. Myers played college basketball for the UCLA Bruins from 1993 to 1997. He was a member of their 1995 NCAA championship team. He served as a radio commentator for UCLA basketball for two seasons until 2002.

Early life
Myers grew up in the San Francisco Bay Area in Danville, California, where he attended Monte Vista High School. At Monte Vista, he lettered in basketball, but he did not imagine playing college basketball for an established program. Only a junior college showed interest in recruiting him. He wanted to continue playing an organized sport, and intended to follow his brother into rowing. In his senior year, he visited the University of California, Los Angeles (UCLA) and intended to talk to their crew team coach.  However, he ran into UCLA assistant basketball coach Steve Lavin, who suggested Myers try out for the basketball team.

College career
Myers attended UCLA and majored in  business and economics, making the Bruins basketball team under coach Jim Harrick as a walk-on in his freshman year in 1993. Myers figured he would be a four-year practice player, but he earned an athletic scholarship in 1994–95, when the Bruins won the national championship that season. He did not score until the final game of the regular season, and he only averaged 0.3 points that season. However, he was on the commemorative cover of Sports Illustrated, lifting teammate Tyus Edney in the air after the point guard made a legendary baseline-to-baseline winning basket with 4.8 seconds remaining in the game against Missouri in the tournament. Additionally, Myers met President Bill Clinton in the White House, appeared with Jay Leno on The Tonight Show, and rode with Mickey Mouse in a ticker tape parade at Disneyland. He was called Forrest Gump by teammates for his apparent good fortune.

Myers' playing time steadily increased. Against Oregon State, Myers was the hero in the Bruins' 69–60 win after he established career highs in points (20) and minutes played (22). In his last season in 1996–97, UCLA advanced to the Elite Eight, and he even started a few games. "That’s another thing that I thought that I would never do," Myers said. "It’s something that I will look back on and tell my kids and my grandkids: 'Yeah, I started a couple of games.'" He did not go to Europe to play basketball after college, which he later called his biggest disappointment.

Sports agent career
Myers was introduced to sports agent Arn Tellem by Harrick, and he began as an intern at Tellem and Associates in 1997 while completing his law degree at Loyola Law School. Myers grew to be one of Tellem's top associates, and became an expert in contract negotiation and player recruitment. In 2000, Tellem and Associates became SFX Sports, where Myers served as vice president. Myers spent 14 years as an agent, the last five with Wasserman Media Group, and he negotiated contracts totaling  more than $575 million. He had 19 clients, including Brandon Roy, Tyreke Evans and Kendrick Perkins.

Executive career

In April 2011, Myers was hired by the Golden State Warriors as an assistant general manager. He was expected to apprentice under general manager Larry Riley for a few years.  However, on April 24, 2012, Myers was promoted to general manager after only 12 months. Under Myers, the Warriors had a strong draft in 2012 and made key acquisitions in 2012–13, and they advanced to the second round of the playoffs before losing to the San Antonio Spurs in six games. It was the Warriors' best postseason finish in 36 years. After the season, The Press Democrat wrote that Myers "made a bigger imprint than anyone else on this season's wonder team."

After the 2014–15 regular season, Myers was named the NBA Executive of the Year after key decisions he made led to the Warriors having an NBA best 67–15 record, including hiring coach Steve Kerr and signing Klay Thompson to a contract extension after declining to trade him and other players in the offseason for Kevin Love.  Myers and the Warriors won the 2015 NBA Finals after defeating the Cleveland Cavaliers in six games. The Warriors came short of back-to-back titles in the 2015–16 season despite having an NBA-record 73-9 regular season, losing to the Cavaliers in seven games.

Prior to 2016–17, the Warriors added president of basketball operations to Myers' title, which reported directly to majority owner Joe Lacob. Myers was again named NBA Executive of the Year after signing Kevin Durant, David West, Zaza Pachulia, and Javale McGee in the 2016 off-season. This was his second Executive of the Year title in three years as the Warriors once again had a league-best 67-15 record. The Warriors won the 2017 NBA Finals after avenging their loss to the Cavaliers, this time in five games. The title was the team's second in three years, which included the league's best postseason record of 16-1, and the best start to the postseason at 15-0. The Warriors won back-to-back titles in the 2017–18 season after defeating the Cavaliers in four games in the 2018 NBA Finals. The Warriors won again in the 2022 NBA Finals, defeating the Boston Celtics in six games.

Personal life
Myers and his wife, Kristen, have three daughters.

See also
List of National Basketball Association team presidents
List of National Basketball Association general managers

References

1975 births
Living people
American men's basketball players
American sports agents
Forwards (basketball)
Golden State Warriors executives
National Basketball Association general managers
People from Danville, California
UCLA Bruins men's basketball players